TPC River's Bend is a private golf club located in Maineville, Ohio.

The Arnold Palmer-designed championship golf course opened in 2001, and is a member of the Tournament Players Club network operated by the PGA Tour. Between 2002 and 2004 it was the venue for the Kroger Classic, a tournament on the Champions Tour. From 2010 to 2012, it hosted the Chiquita Classic on the Web.com Tour.

References

External links

Golf clubs and courses in Ohio
Buildings and structures in Warren County, Ohio